Hans Hamilton (1758–1822) was an Irish MP for County Dublin from 1797 to 1822.

Hans Hamilton may also refer to:

 Hans Hamilton (c. 1758–1822), Anglo-Irish politician
 Hans Hamilton, 4th Baron HolmPatrick (born 1955), British politician
 Sir Hans Hamilton, 1st Baronet (died 1682), Irish MP for County Armagh
 Sir Hans Hamilton, 2nd Baronet (1673–1731), Irish MP for County Armagh and Carlingford
 Hans Hamilton (1674–1728), Irish MP for Killyleagh, Newry and Dundalk
 Hans Hamilton, 2nd Baron HolmPatrick (1886–1942), Irish soldier and peer
 Hans Hamilton, 4th Baron HolmPatrick (born 1955), British Labour Party peer